The Georgiy Zhukov is a Valerian Kuybyshev-class (92-016, OL400) Soviet/Russian river cruise ship, cruising in the Volga basin. The ship was built by Slovenské Lodenice at their shipyard in Komárno, Czechoslovakia, and entered service in 1983. At 4,050 tonnes, Georgiy Zhukov is one of the world's biggest river cruise ships. Her sister ships are Valerian Kuybyshev, Fyodor Shalyapin,  Feliks Dzerzhinskiy, Sergey Kuchkin, Mikhail Frunze, Mstislav Rostropovich, Aleksandr Suvorov and Semyon Budyonnyy. Georgiy Zhukov is currently owned and operated by Vodohod, a Russian river cruise line. Her home port is currently Nizhny Novgorod. Captain of the Georgiy Zhukov (2014) is Viktor Prigorshnev.

Features
The ship has two restaurants, two bars, conference hall, solarium and library.

See also
 List of river cruise ships

References

External links

Project 92-016 

1983 ships
River cruise ships
Ships built in Czechoslovakia